This is a list of Members of Parliament (MPs) elected to the second parliament in the reign of King Charles I in 1626.

The second parliament began on 6 February 1626 and was held to 15 June 1626 when it was dissolved.

List of constituencies and members

See also
List of parliaments of England
2nd Parliament of King Charles I

References
D. Brunton & D. H. Pennington, Members of the Long Parliament (London: George Allen & Unwin, 1954)
Cobbett's Parliamentary history of England, from the Norman Conquest in 1066 to the year 1803 (London: Thomas Hansard, 1808)
Browne Willis Notitia parliamentaria, or, An history of the counties, cities, and boroughs in England and Wales: ... The whole extracted from mss. and printed evidences 1750 pp218-
Yorkshire List of Parliamentary Representatives, from 1542 to 1640

Parliaments of Charles I of England
1626 in England
1626 in politics
1626
 List